The 1988 Nova Scotia general election was held on September 6, 1988 to elect members of the 55th House of Assembly of the Province of Nova Scotia, Canada. It was won by the Progressive Conservative party.

John Dunsworth, who would later gain fame for playing alcoholic trailer park supervisor Jim Lahey on the TV series Trailer Park Boys, stood as the NDP candidate in Halifax Bedford Basin. He finished in third place with a little over 19% of the vote. His underdog campaign was later the subject of a short documentary.

Results

Results by party

Retiring incumbents
Progressive Conservative
Maxine Cochran, Lunenburg Centre
Mike Laffin, Cape Breton Centre
Merryl Lawton, Digby
Donnie MacLeod, Cape Breton East
Alex McIntosh, Yarmouth
Edmund L. Morris, Halifax Needham
Mel Pickings, Lunenburg West
Gerry Sheehy, Annapolis East

New Democratic Party
Bob Levy, Kings South

Nominated candidates
Legend
bold denotes party leader
† denotes an incumbent who is not running for re-election or was defeated in nomination contest

Valley

|-
|bgcolor=whitesmoke|Annapolis East
|
|Graham Smith3,18844.33%
||
|Earl Rayfuse3,51948.93%
|
|Margaret Wolfe4856.74%
|
| 
||
|Gerry Sheehy†
|-
|bgcolor=whitesmoke|Annapolis West
||
|Greg Kerr3,09055.78%
|
|Daurene Lewis2,06837.33%
|
|Nancy Onysko3065.52%
|
|Leo E. MacDonald761.37%
||
|Greg Kerr
|-
|bgcolor=whitesmoke|Clare
||
|Guy LeBlanc3,58754.02%
|
|Nadine Boudreau2,77341.76%
|
|Jan Slakov-Crombie2804.22%
|
|
||
|Guy LeBlanc
|-
|bgcolor=whitesmoke|Digby
|
|Maxine Connell2,68740.43%
||
|Joseph H. Casey3,51452.87%
|
|Susan Jamieson4456.70%
|
|
||
|Merryl Lawton†
|-
|bgcolor=whitesmoke|Hants West
||
|Ron Russell5,09152.84%
|
|Donzell A. Ross2,82929.36%
|
|Penny Reid1,71517.80%
|
|
||
|Ron Russell
|-
|bgcolor=whitesmoke|Kings North
||
|George Archibald3,86845.42%
|
|Glenn Ells3,11636.59%
|
|Don Fraser1,53217.99%
|
|
||
|George Archibald
|-
|bgcolor=whitesmoke|Kings South
||
|Derrick Kimball3,53142.44%
|
|Perry Wallace1,71020.55%
|
|Steve Mattson3,07937.01%
|
|
||
|Bob Levy†
|-
|bgcolor=whitesmoke|Kings West
||
|George Moody5,89959.61%
|
|Frank Bezanson3,11431.47%
|
|Ralph Lynch8838.92%
|
|
||
|George Moody
|}

South Shore

|-
|bgcolor=whitesmoke|Argyle
||
|Neil LeBlanc3,79864.14%
|
|Rick Murphy1,86231.45%
|
|Raymond Ethier2614.41%
|
| 
||
|Neil LeBlanc
|-
|bgcolor=whitesmoke|Lunenburg Centre
||
|Al Mosher5,07146.52%
|
|Don Zwicker4,02436.92%
|
|Muriel Maybee1,80516.56%
|
|
||
|Maxine Cochran†
|-
|bgcolor=whitesmoke|Lunenburg East
|
|Richard P. Eldridge2,35238.91%
||
|Jim Barkhouse3,02450.02%
|
|Wanda Broome62310.31%
|
|Malcolm Callaway460.76%
||
|Jim Barkhouse
|-
|bgcolor=whitesmoke|Lunenburg West
||
|Marie Dechman3,51142.34%
|
|Jack Logan3,24339.11%
|
|John Scott1,53918.56%
|
|
||
|Mel Pickings†
|-
|bgcolor=whitesmoke|Queens
||
|John Leefe4,09956.04%
|
|Dave Randall2,22830.46%
|
|Margo Kleiker98813.51%
|
|
||
|John Leefe
|-
|bgcolor=whitesmoke|Shelburne
|
|Tim Van Zoost4,24141.85%
||
|Harold Huskilson5,22451.54%
|
|Ralph Niessen6706.61%
|
|
||
|Harold Huskilson
|-
|bgcolor=whitesmoke|Yarmouth 
||
|Leroy Legere4,47944.86%
|
|Fraser Mooney4,13841.44%
|
|Brian Noble1,36813.70%
|
| 
||
|Alex McIntosh†
|}

Fundy-Northeast

|-
|bgcolor=whitesmoke|Colchester North
|
|Jack Coupar4,09744.85%
||
|Ed Lorraine4,26046.63%
|
|Penny Marchbank7788.52%
|
|
||
|Jack Coupar
|-
|bgcolor=whitesmoke|Colchester South
||
|R. Colin Stewart3,85556.11%
|
|Larry Thomas2,46235.83%
|
|Julia A. Skipper5548.06%
|
|
||
|R. Colin Stewart
|-
|bgcolor=whitesmoke|Cumberland Centre
|
|Scott Lockart1,10825.26%
||
|Guy Brown3,11771.05%
|
|Gary Thomas1623.69%
|
|
||
|Guy Brown
|-
|bgcolor=whitesmoke|Cumberland East
||
|Roger Stuart Bacon4,75852.31%
|
|Carolyn Drysdale3,27636.02%
|
|Jim Mitchell1,06211.68%
|
|
||
|Roger Stuart Bacon
|-
|bgcolor=whitesmoke|Cumberland West
|
|Gardner Hurley2,30644.31%
||
|Ross Bragg2,38945.91%
|
|Barbara Jack5099.78%
|
|
||
|Gardner Hurley
|-
|bgcolor=whitesmoke|Hants East
|
|Cora Etter3,97741.60%
||
|Jack Hawkins4,50247.09%
|
|Richard Preeper1,08211.32%
|
|
||
|Cora Etter
|-
|bgcolor=whitesmoke|Truro—Bible Hill
||
|Ron Giffin4,47950.43%
|
|Kirby Eileen Grant3,49039.30%
|
|Carol Martin91210.27%
|
|
||
|Ron Giffin
|}

Central Halifax

|-
|bgcolor=whitesmoke|Halifax Bedford Basin
||
|Joel Matheson6,46245.56%
|
|Penny LaRocque4,97735.09%
|
|John Dunsworth2,74619.36%
|
|
||
|Joel Matheson
|-
|bgcolor=whitesmoke|Halifax Chebucto
|
|J. Clair Callaghan3,21435.72%
|
|Penny Doherty2,54628.30%
||
|Alexa McDonough3,23835.99%
|
|
||
|Alexa McDonough
|-
|bgcolor=whitesmoke|Halifax Citadel
||
|Art Donahoe3,28335.11%
|
|Jay Abbass2,88230.82%
|
|Eileen O'Connell3,05732.70%
|
|Frank J. Fawson1281.37%
||
|Art Donahoe
|-
|bgcolor=whitesmoke|Halifax Cornwallis
||
|Terry Donahoe4,19539.91%
|
|Liz Crocker4,01338.18%
|
|Allan O'Brien2,30421.92%
|
|
||
|Terry Donahoe
|-
|bgcolor=whitesmoke|Halifax Needham
|
|Randy Dewell2,11625.56%
||
|Gerry O'Malley3,46941.91%
|
|Maureen MacDonald2,69332.53%
|
|
||
|Edmund L. Morris†
|}

Suburban Halifax

|-
|bgcolor=whitesmoke|Bedford-Musquodoboit Valley
||
|Ken Streatch5,74051.49%
|
|Geoff Regan3,80334.12%
|
|Susan Coldwell1,60414.39%
|
|
||
|Ken Streatch
|-
|bgcolor=whitesmoke|Halifax Atlantic
||
|John Buchanan6,28456.33%
|
|Doug Adams2,76324.77%
|
|Rene Quigley1,97617.71%
|
|Arthur R. Canning770.69%Emanuel Jannasch550.49%
||
|John Buchanan
|-
|bgcolor=whitesmoke|Halifax-St. Margaret's
||
|Jerry Lawrence4,57437.31%
|
|Kevin Burke4,06133.13%
|
|Bill Estabrooks3,62329.56%
|
|
||
|Jerry Lawrence
|-
|bgcolor=whitesmoke|Sackville
|
|Dave Grace4,77431.78%
|
|Bruce Stephen4,81632.06%
||
|John Holm5,43036.15%
|
|
||
|John Holm
|-
|}

Dartmouth/Cole Harbour/Eastern Shore

|-
|bgcolor=whitesmoke|Cole Harbour
||
|David Nantes6,28047.58%
|
|Alan Mitchell4,89237.06%
|
|Flora Christie2,02715.36%
|
|
||
|David Nantes
|-
|bgcolor=whitesmoke|Dartmouth East
|
|Jack Greenough4,94040.88%
||
|Jim Smith5,19342.98%
|
|Maureen Vine1,95016.14%
|
|
||
|Jim Smith
|-
|bgcolor=whitesmoke|Dartmouth North
|
|Laird Stirling3,38941.64%
||
|Sandy Jolly3,51043.13%
|
|Brenda Thompson1,23915.22%
|
|
||
|Laird Stirling
|-
|bgcolor=whitesmoke|Dartmouth South
||
|Roland J. Thornhill4,44947.33%
|
|Allan Peters2,98731.78%
|
|Joanne Lamey1,96320.89%
|
|
||
|Roland J. Thornhill
|-
|bgcolor=whitesmoke|Halifax Eastern Shore
||
|Tom McInnis5,76254.01%
|
|Eric Hill3,81035.71%
|
|David Noseworthy1,09710.28%
|
|
||
|Tom McInnis
|-
|}

Central Nova

|-
|bgcolor=whitesmoke|Antigonish 
|
|Bill Garvie4,46339.57%
||
|Bill Gillis6,00453.24%
|
|Bill Woodfine8117.19%
|
|
||
|Bill Gillis
|-
|bgcolor=whitesmoke|Guysborough
||
|Chuck MacNeil4,50858.23%
|
|Joe Sullivan3,45444.93%
|
|Sarah Wilson5036.54%
|
|
||
|Chuck MacNeil
|-
|bgcolor=whitesmoke|Pictou Centre
||
|Jack MacIsaac6,56657.80%
|
|Bob Leahy3,11627.43%
|
|Gerard Currie1,67714.76%
|
|
||
|Jack MacIsaac
|-
|bgcolor=whitesmoke|Pictou East
||
|Donald Cameron3,99649.84%
|
|Wayne Fraser3,24340.45%
|
|Cecil MacNeil7789.70%
|
|
||
|Donald Cameron
|-
|bgcolor=whitesmoke|Pictou West
||
|Donald P. McInnes3,82454.74%
|
|John J. Henderson2,27832.61%
|
|Geoff Moore88412.65%
|
|
||
|Donald P. McInnes
|}

Cape Breton

|-
|bgcolor=whitesmoke|Cape Breton Centre
|
|Harold MacDonald2,21027.50%
||
|Wayne Connors3,68145.80%
|
|John Wilson2,14626.70%
|
|
||
|Mike Laffin†
|-
|bgcolor=whitesmoke|Cape Breton East
|
|Bruce Clark4,01435.39%
||
|John MacEachern5,73950.60%
|
|Terry McVarish1,59014.02%
|
|
||
|Donnie MacLeod† 
|-
|bgcolor=whitesmoke|Cape Breton North
||
|Brian Young6,01860.68%
|
|Robert E. McGrath2,04220.59%
|
|Gerald Yetman1,85818.73%
|
|
||
|Brian Young
|-
|bgcolor=whitesmoke|Cape Breton Nova
|
|Joe Burke1,06014.05%
|
|Dan MacRury2,60334.51%
|
|Terry Crawley6869.09%
||
|Paul MacEwan3,19442.34%
||
|Paul MacEwan
|-
|bgcolor=whitesmoke|Cape Breton South
|
|Murdock Smith3,46127.78%
||
|Vince MacLean7,82062.76%
|
|Ed MacLeod1,1799.46%
|
|
||
|Vince MacLean
|-
|bgcolor=whitesmoke|Cape Breton—The Lakes
|
|John Newell3,28235.52%
||
|Bernie Boudreau4,19245.37%
|
|Helen MacDonald1,76619.11%
|
|
||
|John Newell
|-
|bgcolor=whitesmoke|Cape Breton West
|
|"Big" Donnie MacLeod4,05035.87%
||
|Russell MacKinnon6,13354.31%
|
|Con Mills1,1099.82%
|
|
||
|"Big" Donnie MacLeod
|-
|bgcolor=whitesmoke|Inverness North
|
|Norman J. MacLean2,86536.16%
||
|Charles MacArthur3,66646.27%
|
|Ben Boucher1,39217.57%
|
|
||
|Norman J. MacLean
|-
|bgcolor=whitesmoke|Inverness South
|
|Archie MacLachlan86615.87%
||
|Danny Graham2,18540.03%
|
|Martin Beaton3456.32%
|
|Billy Joe MacLean2,06237.78%
||
|Billy Joe MacLean
|-
|bgcolor=whitesmoke|Richmond
|
|Robert F. Martel3,13541.70%
||
|Richie Mann3,52846.93%
|
|Clair Rankin85511.37%
|
|
||
|Vacant
|-
|bgcolor=whitesmoke|Victoria
|
|Fisher Hudson2,07639.40%
||
|Kennie MacAskill2,71951.60%
|
|Fraser Patterson4749.00%
|
|
||
|Fisher Hudson
|}

References

1988
Nova Scotia
1988 in Nova Scotia
September 1988 events in Canada